Michael Francis Middleton (born 23 June 1949) is a British businessman. He is the father of Catherine, Princess of Wales, Philippa Matthews and James Middleton.

Born in Leeds, Middleton was educated at the University of Surrey. He joined British Airways and worked as a flight dispatcher. In 1980, he married Carole Goldsmith, who founded Party Pieces, a mail-order party supply company. Middleton joined his wife at the company in 1989. Their first three grandchildren, Prince George, Princess Charlotte, and Prince Louis, are second, third and fourth in line to the British throne respectively. The Middletons reside at Bucklebury Manor, in Berkshire.

Early life, education, and early career 
Michael Francis Middleton was born in Leeds on 23 June 1949 into a wealthy family. He spent his early years in Moortown, Leeds. Royal historian Robert Lacey describes the Middleton family as having aristocratic kinship, with Florence Kitson, Baroness Airedale (1868–1942) being Middleton's distant relative. The Middleton family, including Michael's grandfather Richard Noël Middleton and his wife Olive, had played host to members of the British royal family in Leeds from the 1920s. 

Middleton's mother was Valerie Middleton (née Glassborow, 1924–2006), who served as a VAD nurse and code-breaker during the Second World War. His father, Captain Peter Middleton (1920–2010), was a pilot who served as a RAF fighter pilot during the Second World War. He flew alongside Prince Philip as co-pilot on a two-month flying tour of South America in 1962. British Pathé newsreel film shows Middleton alongside the prince during the tour. Middleton has three brothers: Richard (b.1947), Simon (b.1952)  and Nicholas (b.1956). Richard's son, Adam Middleton, is godfather to Michael's granddaughter, Princess Charlotte. Adam's sister Lucy Middleton – a lawyer who, like her brother attended Bedales School – is  godmother to Michael's grandson, Prince Louis.

Like his father and grandfather, Middleton was educated at Clifton College, a public school in Bristol. At Clifton, all three generations of Middleton men boarded at Brown's House. The archives at Clifton record that Middleton was a praepostor, the title for a college prefect. Middleton represented Clifton at rugby in the 1st XV and also gained his tennis colours.

Following Clifton, Middleton attended the University of Surrey which conferred the degree of B.Sc (Hons) on him in 1973 according to the entry in the Clifton College Register 1962–1978, published by Clifton College Council in October 1979. Middleton then commenced studies for six months at British European Airways' flight school to become a pilot before switching to ground crew where he graduated from the company's own internal course. He then worked for British Airways as a flight dispatcher.

Marriage and family 
Middleton met his future wife Carole when they worked for British Airways (BA) as ground crew. By 1979, he was promoted to aircraft dispatcher, one of British Airways' Red Caps, at London Heathrow Airport. They married on 21 June 1980 at St James's Parish Church in Dorney, Buckinghamshire, and later bought a Victorian house in Bradfield Southend near Reading, Berkshire.

The Middletons have three children, two daughters and a son. Following the birth of Catherine Elizabeth (born 1982) and Philippa Charlotte (born 1983), the family moved to Amman, Jordan, where Michael worked as a manager for BA from 1984 to 1986. Their youngest child, James William, was born in 1987.

Later career and inherited wealth 
Carole Middleton established Party Pieces, a company making party bags in 1987. It branched into party supplies and decorations by mail order and by 1995 was managed by both Michael and Carole Middleton and had moved into farm buildings at Ashampstead Common. At this time the Middletons purchased Oak Acre, a Tudor-style manor house in Bucklebury, Berkshire. In 2002, the Middletons bought a flat in Chelsea, in which their children lived. Carole and Michael Middleton are also the owners of a racehorse. By 2012, the Middletons had moved to Bucklebury Manor, a Georgian mansion with an 18-acre estate where their grandson Prince George spent his first few weeks.

The Middletons' business was successful,  and along with trust funds inherited by Michael from his aristocrat grandmother, Olive Christiana Middleton (née Lupton), enabled the family to continue the Middleton family tradition of sending their children to board at independent schools. All three children were sent to St Andrew's School, Pangbourne and both daughters were sent to Downe House School, a girls' boarding school in Cold Ash, and Marlborough College, in Wiltshire. James also attended Marlborough.

The British press created the term Upper Middleton Class to describe the family's social position; other reports refer to the family as being "minted [...] with a smattering of blue-blooded antecedents". Their wealth has resulted in the Middletons being reported to be multi-millionaires.

Ancestry 
Michael Middleton's grandmother, Olive Middleton was photographed at Headingley, in 1927, in the procession of dignitaries following Princess Mary who was patron of the Leeds Infirmary fundraising committee of which Olive was a member. Olive's husband, Richard Noel Middleton co-founded the Yorkshire Symphony Orchestra of which the Princess and her son George were patrons. Richard Noel Middleton and his cousin Ralph Middleton, grandson of Sir Henry Berney, 9th Baronet, were solicitors at the Leeds law firm Messrs Middleton & Sons founded by their ancestor, William Middleton in 1834. Michael Middleton's great grandfather, politician Francis Martineau Lupton, was the son of Yorkshire landowner Francis W. Lupton, Esq., whose marriage to educationalist Frances Lupton (née Greenhow) on 1 July 1847, is listed in The Patrician John Burke's supplement to Burke's Peerage. Her father was surgeon Thomas Michael Greenhow whose wife, Elizabeth, was a member of the Martineau family. Many portraits of Elizabeth's siblings, sociologist Harriet Martineau and James Martineau, a friend of Queen Victoria, are held in London's National Portrait Gallery.

Michael Middleton's family is linked, via his Leeds-born cousin, Lady Bullock (née Barbara Lupton), to William Petty-FitzMaurice,1st Marquess of Lansdowne, Prime Minister of Great Britain between 1782–1783. Through his direct ancestor, Dame Anne Fairfax (née Gascoigne), Michael Middleton has several descents from King Edward III.

The Rev. Thomas Davis, a Church of England hymn-writer is Michael Middleton's paternal ancestor.

Arms

Further reading

References

External links 

 

1949 births
Living people
People educated at Clifton College
Alumni of the University of Surrey
British people of English descent
20th-century British businesspeople
21st-century British businesspeople
British racehorse owners and breeders
20th-century English people
21st-century English people
Middleton family (British)